The Singapore Masters was an annual men's professional golf tournament which was played in Singapore from 2001 to 2007. It was co-sanctioned by the Asian Tour and the European Tour, and was one of many European Tour events established in East Asia since the early 1990s. 

There have been two important firsts at the Singapore Masters. At the 2002 event, Arjun Atwal became the first Indian golfer to win on the European Tour, and the following year Zhang Lianwei became the first golfer from the People's Republic of China to do so when he overcame then world number 2 Ernie Els on the final hole. In 2006 the prize fund was $1,000,000, which is one of the smaller purses on the European Tour.

There is also a Singapore Open golf tournament, which is part of the Asian Tour's schedule. It is the Asian Tour's flagship event and carries higher prize money than the Singapore Masters. 

The 2008 event was canceled following a failure to find a sponsor for the event.

Winners

See also
Merlion Masters, a golf tournament on the Asian Tour played in Singapore in 1995 and 1996.
Rolex Masters, a golf tournament played in Singapore from 1973 to 1998.

Notes

References

External links
Coverage on the European Tour's official site

Former European Tour events
Former Asian Tour events
Golf tournaments in Singapore
Recurring sporting events established in 2001
Recurring sporting events disestablished in 2007
2001 establishments in Singapore
2007 disestablishments in Singapore
Defunct sports competitions in Singapore